Merveille Biankadi (born 9 May 1995) is a German professional footballer who plays as a midfielder for  club 1. FC Heidenheim.

Career
Born in Munich, Biankadi played youth football with FC Phönix München, Bayern Munich and FC Augsburg. He played for FC Augsburg II, SV Elversberg, FC Rot-Weiß Erfurt and FC Hansa Rostock before signing with Heidenheim. In January 2021, Heidenheim loaned Biankadi to his hometown club TSV 1860 Munich.

Personal life
Born in Germany, Biankadi is of Congolese descent.

References

External links

1995 births
Living people
Footballers from Munich
German footballers
German sportspeople of Democratic Republic of the Congo descent
Association football midfielders
FC Augsburg II players
SV Elversberg players
FC Rot-Weiß Erfurt players
FC Hansa Rostock players
1. FC Heidenheim players
Eintracht Braunschweig players
TSV 1860 Munich players
Regionalliga players
3. Liga players
2. Bundesliga players